V. S. Ramadevi (15 January 1934 – 17 April 2013) was an Indian politician who was the first lady to become the 8th Governor of Karnataka and 9th Chief Election Commissioner of India from 26 November 1990 to 11 December 1990. She was the first woman to become Chief Election Commissioner of India. She was succeeded by T. N. Seshan. Ramadevi was the first (and to date, only) woman to serve as Secretary General of the Rajya Sabha, from 1 July 1993 to 25 September 1997. And also she was the first and to date only female Governor of Karnataka, from 2 December 1999 to 20 August 2002.

Career
Ramadevi was born in Chebrolu of West Godavari District, Andhra Pradesh, India on 15 January 1934 (which happens to be the date of the Sankranti harvest festival). She was educated in Eluru. She registered her name as advocate after completing M.A. LLB in the Andhra Pradesh High Court. She served as the Governor of Himachal Pradesh from 26 July 1997 to 1 December 1999 and as the Governor of Karnataka from 2 December 1999 to 20 August 2002.

She died on 17 April 2013 in her residence in HSR Layout Bangalore.

References

External links
 Biography at Governor of Karnataka website

Chief Election Commissioners of India
1934 births
2013 deaths
Governors of Karnataka
Governors of Himachal Pradesh
Indian civil servants
People from Guntur district
Women state governors of India
Women in Himachal Pradesh politics
Women in Karnataka politics
20th-century Indian women politicians
20th-century Indian politicians
21st-century Indian women politicians
21st-century Indian politicians